

A

B

C

D

E

F

G

H

I

J

K

L

M

N

O

Q

R

S

T

U

W

X

Y

Z

Feminine

A

B

C

D

E

F

H

I

J

K

L

M

N

Q

R

S

T

U

W

Y

Z

Unisex

A

C

D

F

I

L

N

W

Z

References

 
 
Arabic given